John Antonopoulos (born November 14, 1952 in Malden, Massachusetts, United States), known professionally as Johnny A, is an American musician, guitarist, and songwriter.

Early life
Johnny A. was born in Malden, Massachusetts, of Greek heritage. Growing up in the Boston area, he became interested in music, starting with drums at age six. Upon being exposed to The Beatles in 1964 at age 11, Johnny's parents bought him a $49 Lafayette Electronics guitar. He stated his last name, Antonopoulos (of Greek origin), was always getting mispronounced. "It's always been Johnny A. since age eight.”

Career

1970s
In the 1970s, Johnny A. formed a band called the Streets, performing mostly in the Boston area. they had several popular radio singles, including "What Gives", which took the top spot on WBCN "The Rock of Boston". As well as headlining in Boston clubs, The Streets toured with and supported several major artists including Aerosmith and Bob Seger. They also competed in the first WBCN "Rock 'n' Roll Rumble" in 1979.

1980s – 1990s
In 1980 Johnny formed the band Hidden Secret. They had a string of local hit singles including "No More Lonely Nights", which occupied the top spot on WBCN for 26 weeks.

In 1986 his next band, Hearts On Fire, placed second in the 1986 WBCN Rock & Roll Rumble (after Gang Green), and continued to produce local hit singles.

Through the 1980s and 1990s, while working as a sideman, Johnny played with Santana percussionist Mingo Lewis, blues and soul duo Delaney & Bonnie, Derek & the Dominos keyboardist Bobby Whitlock, and had a brief stint with Creedence Clearwater Revival drummer Doug Clifford. He then began a seven-year role as guitarist and musical director for the J. Geils Band front man Peter Wolf. He played on Wolf's albums, co-produced his album Long Line, and joined him on world tours.

In 1999, Johnny A. launched his solo career and independently released his debut CD Sometime Tuesday Morning.

2000s
In 2000, Johnny A. signed a licensing deal to re-release his first album with Steve Vai's Favored Nations Entertainment

In 2001, Sometime Tuesday Morning  was re-released on Steve Vai's Favored Nations Entertainment label Sony/RED distribution. The album spawned the #1 single "Oh Yeah" across the USA on the AAA radio format. It marked the first time in over a decade that an instrumental had achieved the top spot on radio.  STM went on to sell over 150,000 copies.

In 2003, Sometime Tuesday Morning was then picked up for distribution by Danny Goldberg at Artemis Records, and Gibson Custom Guitar company, in close collaboration with Johnny, released a "Johnny A." Signature Model guitar, designed to the artist's specifications.

In 2003, Johnny A. signed a multi-record contract with Steve Vai's Sony/Red distributed Favored Nations Entertainment and saw the release of the "radio-only" promotional Johnny A. Christmas single "Sleigh Ride", released on the label.

In 2004, Get Inside was released on the Favored Nations Label, yielding two radio singles, "I Had To Laugh," which made the Grammy nominations ballot, and a radio edit of the title track "Get Inside."

In 2006, Warner Bros./Alfred Publishing released a Johnny A. instructional DVD entitled Taste, Tone, Space.

In 2007, Gibson Custom guitar company released a second Johnny A. signature guitar, the Johnny A. Standard.

2010s
In 2010, Johnny A. released One November Night (2010 Aglaophone Records), a live DVD/CD set recorded at Sculler's Jazz in his hometown of Boston, MA. In 2010, Johnny also became the recipient of The Boston Music Award's Blues Artist of the Year 2010.

In June 2014, Johnny A. released, Driven, marking his engineering debut as well as mixing, producing and playing all the instruments on the album. On December 14, 2014, Johnny was inducted into the Boston Music Hall of Fame at the Boston Music Awards. The same year, Gibson Custom released a "new" version of the Johnny A. Standard.

In 2015, Johnny A. joined The Yardbirds, touring and playing with the group as lead guitarist. On July 23, 2018, after playing with the band for three years, he announced on his website that he will not be appearing at any future Yardbirds performances.

In 2017, Epiphone guitar company released the Limited Edition Johnny A. Custom Outfit - guitar, case, and autographed certificate of authenticity.

2020s
In 2020, during the Covid 19 lockdown Johnny A. did a 5 day a week 90 minute free morning livestream broadcast from his facebook page facebook.com/JohnnyA.Official - approximately 300+ episodes

In 2021, also during the C19 lockdown, Johnny A. recorded a 21 song yet to be released instrumental re-imagining of Beatles' songs - working title "From A. To Beatles"

On September 15, 2022 the Fender Custom Shop launched the Johnny A. "Signature" Stratocaster made to the artist's specifications and released in two first time colors for Fender, Lydian Gold Metallic with chrome hardware and Sunset Glow Metallic with gold hardware. https://www.fendercustomshop.com/guitars/stratocaster/johnny-a-signature-stratocaster-time-capsule-round-laminated-3a-rosewood-fingerboard-sunset-glow-metallic-with-gold-hardware/

Style
Johnny's style often recalls Danny Gatton as well as some aspects of Jeff Beck and Pat Martino.  He encompasses elements of rock, jazz, and blues, and he often uses a whammy bar. He cites artists such as The Beatles, The Yardbirds, Everly Brothers, Wes Montgomery, Chet Atkins, Jeff Beck, Jimi Hendrix and Les Paul as many of his musical influences.

Discography

Sometime Tuesday Morning
Release 1999 (Aglaophone Records) - International Re-Release 2001 (Favored Nations/Aglaophone Records)
Tracks:
1. "Sometime Tuesday Morning"
2. "Oh Yeah"
3. "Wichita Lineman"
4. "Two Wheel Horse"
5. "In The Wind"
6. "Yes It Is"
7. "You Don't Love Me"
8. "Up In The Attic"
9. "Walk Don't Run"
10. "Tex Critter"
11. "Lullabye For Nicole"
12. "Walkin' West Ave."

"Sleigh Ride"
2002 Radio Promo Single (Favored Nations/Aglaophone Records)
Tracks:
1. "Sleigh Ride"
2. "Oh Yeah"

Get Inside
2004 (Favored Nations)
Tracks:
1. "Hip Bone"
2. "I Had To Laugh"
3. "Poor Side of Town"
4. "Sing Singin'"
5. "Get Inside"
6. "Bundle Of Joy"
7. "Krea Gata"
8. "The Wind Cries Mary"
9. "Ignorance Is Bliss"
10."Sway A Little"
11."Stimulation"
12."Another Life"

Taste • Tone • Space
2006 (Alfred Publishing)
Instructional Guitar DVD

One November Night
2010 - Live DVD/CD 2 - Disc Set (Aglaophone Records)
Tracks:
1. "I Had To Laugh"
2. "Sing Singin'"
3. "The Wind Cries Mary"
4. "Tex Critter"
5. "Lullabye For Nicole"
6. "Two Wheel Horse"
7. "Get Inside"
8. "The Night Before"
9. "Krea Gata"
10."Ignorance Is Bliss"
11."Wichita Lineman"
12."Memphis, Tennessee"
13."Jimi Jam"
14."Walk Away Renée"

Driven
2014 - (Aglaophone Records)
Tracks:
1. "Ghost"
2. "A Mask You Wear"
3. "C'mon, C'mon"
4. "The Night I Said Goodbye"
5. "From A Dark Place"
6. "To Love Somebody"
7. "Out Of Nowhere"
8. "The Arizona Man"
9. "It Must Have Been You"
10."Backbone Slip"
11."Gone... (Like a Sunset)"

Other contributions
Bobby Whitlock Live at The Bottom Line - NYC -10/92  (1992)
For The Love Of Harry, (tribute to Harry Nilsson) Peter Wolf & The Houseparty 5 (1995), guitar "You're Breakin' My Heart"
Long Line, Peter Wolf  (1996), guitar/co-producer
Fool's Parade, Peter Wolf (1998), guitar on "Ride Lonesome, Ride Hard"
Beloved Few, Beloved Few  (1998) bajo sexto on the song "The Beloved Few"
Sometime Tuesday Morning songbook Warner Bros./Alfred Publishing (2001)
WYEP Live and Direct: Volume 4 - On Air Performances (2002) "Tex Critter"
Get Inside songbook - Alfred Publishing (2004)
One Last Wish, Stu Kimball  (2006) featured guitarist on the songs "Little One" and "Elation"
Counting Down, The Brooks Young Band (2010) featured guitarist on the title song "Counting Down"
Just Across The River, Jimmy Webb (2010) featured guitarist on the song "Galveston"
Jim McCarty and Friends Live from Callahan's, Jim McCarty (2011) Johnny A. co-wrote with and is featured with Jim McCarty on the songs "J&A Jump" and "South Boulevard Blues"
Thank You Les, CD and documentary tribute to Les Paul (2012). Johnny A. is featured on the song "Sweet Georgia Brown"
Beautiful, Jerad Finck featuring Johnny A. (2012) featured guitarist on the song "Beautiful"
Deja Blues, Gary Hoey (2013)  lead/rhythm and slide guitars on the song "She's Walking"
Two Roads East,  Jon Butcher (2016) featured solo on the song "Transcendence"
Eye Of The Writer, Jim Peterik (2016) featured guitarist on the song "Vehicle"

References

External links
 Official Web Site
 Johnny A. Interview - by Brian D. Holland, Modern Guitars Magazine 2006
 "Johnny A. On the fast track By Ann Wickstrom", Vintage Guitar Magazine
 The Epiphone Interview: Johnny A.

American blues guitarists
American rock guitarists
American male guitarists
American people of Greek descent
1952 births
People from Malden, Massachusetts
Living people
Songwriters from Massachusetts
American rock songwriters
Guitarists from Massachusetts
20th-century American guitarists
20th-century American male musicians
Favored Nations artists
American male songwriters